Agridi may refer to several places in Greece:

Agridi, Achaea, a village in Achaea 
Agridi, Arcadia, a village in Arcadia 
Agridi, Elis, a village in Elis